Li Lanqing (born 22 May 1932) is a retired Chinese politician who served as first-ranked Vice Premier of the People's Republic of China between 1998 and 2003. He was a member of the Politburo Standing Committee of the Chinese Communist Party (CCP) between 1997 and 2002, and a regular Politburo member from 1992 to 1997.

Biography
Born in Zhenjiang, Jiangsu province. He initially worked at First Automobile Works. Li graduated from the Business Management Department of Fudan University in Shanghai in 1952. Then in 1956 he was sent to study in the Soviet Union, where he worked as an intern in two Moscow-based automobile factories. In 1959, he began working as a secretary at the First Ministry of Machine-Building. In 1962, he began working as a secretary at the National Economics Commission. After the Cultural Revolution began in 1966, he was sent down to perform labour at a May 7th Cadre School. In 1972, he resumed work at Second Automobile Works. In 1978, he took part in the planning sessions for a "Third Automobile Works".In 1981, after economic reforms began, Li was sent to work for the central government in Beijing, leading the Office of Foreign Government Debt at the State Foreign Investment Commission. In 1983 he was again transferred to Tianjin, where he worked under mayor Li Ruihuan as a vice mayor. Li later held positions in the First Ministry of Machine Building Industry and the State Economic Commission.Li also served as director-general of the Foreign Investment Administration of the Ministry of Foreign Economic Relations and Trade. Li was also Executive Vice Minister and then Minister of Foreign Economic Relations and Trade.Between 1997 and 2002, he was a member of the Politburo Standing Committee of the Communist Party of China, the pinnacle of power in Chinese politics.  While in government he was the first-ranked Vice-Premier, sometimes known as "Executive Vice Premier". In his capacity as Vice Premier, Li was responsible for national education policy. He is the author of "Education for 1.3 Billion: On 10 Years of Education Reform and Development." The book has sold more than 750,000 copies in China and has been translated into English.After retiring, Li practiced calligraphy. He also attempted to get a job as a shopkeeper at a local convenience store, but was ultimately not hired after being recognized by the owner. he lately attended the 20th Party Congress at age 90.

References

External links 
 Li Lanqing biography @ China Vitae

1932 births
Living people
Chinese Communist Party politicians from Jiangsu
Delegates to the 8th National People's Congress
Delegates to the 9th National People's Congress
First vice premiers of the People's Republic of China
Fudan University alumni
Jinan University alumni
Members of the 14th Politburo of the Chinese Communist Party
Members of the 15th Politburo Standing Committee of the Chinese Communist Party
People's Republic of China politicians from Jiangsu
Politicians from Zhenjiang
Vice Premiers of the People's Republic of China